Beddington Lane tram stop is a stop on the Tramlink tramway. There was previously a railway station on this site, on the single track line from Wimbledon to West Croydon, which closed in 1997 in order for it to be converted for Tramlink use. The stop is accessible from the east from Beddington Lane, and also from the pathway leading to the west and south. In late 2014, the track immediately to the west of the tram stop was doubled, though further west the bridge carrying trams over the main line at Mitcham Junction is still single-track.

It is one of two Tramlink stops within the London Borough of Sutton, the other being Therapia Lane.

Connections
London Buses route 463 serves the tram stop while routes 264 and 455 are a short walk from the stop.

References

Tramlink stops in the London Borough of Sutton
Railway stations in Great Britain opened in 2000